St. Mary's Catholic Church is a historic church at 429 Central Avenue in Sandusky, Ohio.

It was built in 1873 and added to the National Register in 1975.

References

Churches on the National Register of Historic Places in Ohio
Gothic Revival church buildings in Ohio
Roman Catholic churches completed in 1873
Churches in Erie County, Ohio
National Register of Historic Places in Erie County, Ohio
Roman Catholic churches in Sandusky, Ohio
19th-century Roman Catholic church buildings in the United States